Bereg may refer to:

 Bereg (Sokolac), a village in Bosnia and Herzegovina
 Bereg County, a historic county of the former Kingdom of Hungary
 Bački Breg or Bereg (Croatian), a village in Serbia
 A-222 Bereg, a Russian self-propelled 130 mm coastal defence gun
 Igor Mangushev (died 2023) Russian mercenary who used the call sign Bereg

See also 
 Szabolcs-Szatmár-Bereg, an administrative county in Hungary